"Holiday" is a song recorded by South Korean girl group Girls' Generation for their sixth studio album Holiday Night (2017). The song was released digitally on August 4, 2017, as the album's single alongside "All Night" by SM Entertainment.

Composition 
According to Billboards Tamar Herman, "Holiday" is a bubblegum pop song that features "bright" funk elements and synthesizers in its composition. Jacques Peterson from Idolator also noted the "retro-meets-modern flavor" of the track. Lyrically, the song is a dedication to Girls' Generation's longevity and bond with their supporters which, according to Herman, is "atypical" for K-pop girl groups. "I'm feeling good, I've been waiting for this day/ We meet again like that first time we met [...] Today is our holiday/ A wonderful day came that we've been waiting for a long time."

Chart performance 
"Holiday" debuted at number 19 on the Gaon Digital Chart, on the chart issue dated July 30 - August 5, 2017, with 70,125 downloads sold.

Reception 
Tamar Herman from Billboard labelled the song "timelessly peppy" and praised the "earworm-style chorus" of the song that are of Girls' Generation's signature styles. She further lauded the group's "diverse vocal colors" expressed via the "high notes and ad-libs" that enabled each of the member to shine. Idolator's Jacques Peterson wrote, "Even if you don’t listen to K-Pop, these tracks ["All Night" and "Holiday"] are absolute must-haves for any pop playlist this summer."

Charts

Credits 
Credits are adapted from Holiday Night liner notes.

Studio 
 SM Blue Ocean Studio – recording
 MonoTree Studio – recording, digital editing
 SM Yellow Tail Studio – recording, mixing
 SM Big Shot Studio – digital editing
 Sterling Sound – mastering

Personnel 

 SM Entertainment – executive producer
 Lee Soo-man – producer
 Kim Young-min – executive supervisor
 Yoo Young-jin – music and sound supervisor
 Girls' Generation – vocals, background vocals
 Seohyun – lyrics
 JQ – lyrics
 Kim Hee-jung – lyrics
 Louise Frick Sveen – composition, background vocals
 Lawrence Lee – composition, arrangement
 Marta Grauers – composition
 G-High – vocal directing, recording, digital editing, Pro Tools operating
 Kim Cheol-sun – recording
 Lee Min-gyu – digital editing
 Gu Jong-pil – recording, mixing
 Randy Merrill – mastering

References 

Girls' Generation songs
2017 singles
2017 songs
SM Entertainment singles